Danton is a 1983 French language film depicting the last weeks of Georges Danton, one of the leaders of the French Revolution. It is an adaptation of the 1929 play The Danton Case by Stanisława Przybyszewska.

The film stars Gérard Depardieu in the title role, with Wojciech Pszoniak as Maximilien Robespierre, and Patrice Chéreau as Camille Desmoulins. It was directed by the Polish director Andrzej Wajda and was an international co-production between companies in France, Poland and West Germany. All supporters of Danton (with the exception of Bourdon, who would later betray him) are played by French actors, while Robespierre's allies are played by Poles. Alain Depardieu, Gérard's brother, is listed in the credits as Director of Production.

Not always rigidly historical, the film was accused of drawing parallels between the Reign of Terror during the French Revolution and the situation in contemporary Poland, in which the Solidarity movement was struggling against the oppression of the Soviet-backed Polish government; however, this was denied by the filmmakers. The film had 1,392,779 admissions in France.

Plot 
The film begins in Paris in the cold spring of 1794 when the Reign of Terror is in full swing, with vehicles entering the city being searched and long lines of citizens grumbling in the rain as they wait to buy scarce bread. Ill in his flat, Robespierre sees Danton in the street, just returned from the country and being acclaimed by the hungry and dispirited people as their hero.

When Héron, head of the secret police, calls round, Robespierre instructs him to destroy the print shop of Desmoulins, who is publishing pro-Danton circulars. While Robespierre is being tended by his barber, his friend Saint-Just comes in and urges him to have Danton guillotined. He ignores him and goes to a meeting of the Committee of Public Safety, the effective government of France, where other members also push for the elimination of Danton. Robespierre resists, because Danton is so popular with the ordinary people and is his friend.

Before that day's sitting of the National Convention, the legislative assembly of the country, General Westermann discusses with Danton a coup to overthrow the tyranny of Robespierre and the Committee. Danton disapproves, even though friends warn him that Robespierre is planning to have him jailed and he should strike first. Danton is positive that the influence of his newspaper, Le Vieux Cordelier, and the support of the people will keep him safe. However, he asks his supporter Bourdon to denounce Héron and his secret police in the Convention, which leads to Héron's arrest.

That night, Danton asks Robespierre to an elaborate dinner in a private room of a restaurant, fortifying himself in advance with copious wine. Robespierre refuses to eat and insists on a serious talk. He asks Danton to join his cause and stop fighting him, because he does not want to be forced to have Danton executed. Danton simply carries on drinking and refuses all Robespierre’s advances. After Robespierre has left in disgust, in the street Danton meets a group of armed men who turn out to be part of Westermann's preparations for a coup. Once again, Danton refuses to join their illegal venture.

Robespierre, having failed with Danton, then goes to the house of Desmoulins, who is furious that his printing business has been destroyed and refuses to talk to him. Robespierre tries to convince him that Danton is exploiting him, but is ignored. Desmoulins' wife begs Robespierre to stay and talk sense into her husband, because she wants him to live, but Robespierre can achieve nothing. He goes to the Committee of Public Safety and orders a warrant for the arrest that night of Danton, Desmoulins, Westermann and several of their associates. Though Danton could still rally support, he does not want to cause more bloodshed and accepts arrest, claiming that his oratory and the affection of the people will protect him.

At the National Convention in the  morning, members are outraged at the arrests, but Robespierre simply justifies his action by stating that Danton is an enemy of the Republic and must be tried regardless of his popularity. Having escaped arrest, Bourdon hastily changes sides and backs Robespierre. When the trial opens before the Revolutionary Tribunal, only seven jurors can be found who will agree to vote Danton guilty but it continues regardless. Danton keeps breaking order to address the spectators, and the prosecutor Fouquier is unhappy because he has insufficient grounds for a conviction. Back in prison that night, Danton's confidence is shaken when another prisoner tells him how overjoyed he is to hear that Danton, the first president of the Committee and the creator of the Revolutionary Tribunal, is to be executed.

Next day, while visiting the studio of the painter Jacques-Louis David, Robespierre is told by Fouquier that Danton's constant interruptions are making a farce of the trial, which lacks validity anyhow. Robespierre gets the Committee to issue a decree that anyone who speaks out of turn will be removed from court. Within minutes, all the accused have been bundled out and the verdict of guilty is read.

On the day before their execution Danton is depressed, not because of his death but because he feels that he has failed the people. Once the condemned men have been taken through the silent crowds to the scaffold and guillotined, Robespierre's long-maintained tension breaks and he relapses into shock. The noble ideals of the Revolution in the Declaration of the Rights of Man and of the Citizen, recited to him by a child forced to learn it by heart, are fatally compromised.

Principal cast 
 Gérard Depardieu as Georges Danton
 Wojciech Pszoniak as Maximilien Robespierre
 Patrice Chéreau as Camille Desmoulins
 Bogusław Linda as Louis de Saint-Just
 Angela Winkler as Lucile Desmoulins
 Andrzej Seweryn as François Louis Bourdon
 Serge Merlin as Pierre Philippeaux
 Roland Blanche as Jean-François Delacroix
 Jacques Villeret as François Joseph Westermann
 Anne Alvaro as Éléonore Duplay
 Roger Planchon as Antoine Quentin Fouquier-Tinville
 Franciszek Starowieyski as Jacques-Louis David
 Alain Macé as François Héron

Reception
The film had been sponsored by France's first socialist government for decades, in anticipation of the bicentenary of the Revolution in 1989. Before its release, a private showing to the President of the Republic, François Mitterrand, and the Minister of Culture, Jack Lang, evoked a frosty reaction. They had not expected such a cynical tale of power politics, show trials and cold-blooded judicial murder, familiar though it all was in Eastern Europe under Soviet control.

Awards
 Prix Louis-Delluc 1982: Andrzej Wajda
 César 1983, Best director: Andrzej Wajda
 BAFTA  Awards 1983, Best Foreign Language Film: Danton
 Montréal World Film Festival 1983, Best Actor: Gérard Depardieu & Wojciech Pszoniak
 National Society of Film Critics Awards, USA 1983, Best Actor: Gérard Depardieu
 Polish Film Festival 1984: Andrzej Wajda
 London Critics Circle Film Awards 1984, Director of the Year: Andrzej Wajda

References

External links
 
 
 1983 review by Vincent Canby at  nytimes.com
Danton: The Worst of Times an essay by Leonard Quart at the Criterion Collection

1983 films
1980s biographical drama films
1980s historical drama films
1980s political drama films
French historical drama films
1980s French-language films
Films set in 1794
Films about Georges Danton
Cultural depictions of Georges Danton
Cultural depictions of Maximilien Robespierre
French political drama films
French films based on plays
Films directed by Andrzej Wajda
Best Foreign Language Film BAFTA Award winners
Films whose director won the Best Director César Award
Louis Delluc Prize winners
Films with screenplays by Jean-Claude Carrière
French Revolution films
1983 drama films
1980s French films